Morum inerme is a species of sea snail, a marine gastropod mollusk, in the family Harpidae.

Description
The length of the shell attains 45.3 mm.

Distribution
The holotype of this species was found on the Nazareth Bank, western Indian Ocean.

References

 Lorenz F. (2014) A new species of Morum from the western Indian Ocean (Gastropoda: Harpidae). Conchylia 44(3-4): 2-5.

inerme
Gastropods described in 2014